Aquaculture Research is a peer-reviewed academic journal on fisheries science and aquaculture published by John Wiley & Sons since 1970. The journal is abstracted and indexed in the Science Citation Index, Scopus, AGRICOLA, Biosis, Food Science & Technology Abstracts, Academic Search Premier, and GEOBASE. According to the Journal Citation Reports, the journal has a 2020 impact factor of 2.082, ranking it 24th out of 55 journals in the category "Fisheries". Starting as Fisheries Management in 1970, the journal changed names in 1985 to Aquaculture and Fisheries Management and to Aquaculture Research in 1995.

References

External links 
 

English-language journals
Wiley (publisher) academic journals
Publications established in 1970
Hybrid open access journals
Agricultural journals